Khoroshavka is a rural locality (a settlement) in Suvorovsky Selsoviet, Blagoveshchensky District, Altai Krai, Russia. The population was 126 as of 2013. There are 5 streets.

Geography 
Khoroshavka is located 39 km east of Blagoveshchenka (the district's administrative centre) by road. Lenki is the nearest rural locality.

References 

Rural localities in Blagoveshchensky District, Altai Krai